The siege of Genoa (6 April – 4 June 1800) saw Austria besiege and capture the city of Genoa from France during the War of the Second Coalition. However, the battle was ultimately a successful diversion conducted by André Masséna's forces that allowed Napoleon to win the subsequent Battle of Marengo. In the end, around 30,000 of Genoa's 160,000 inhabitants had died of starvation and disease in the course of the siege.

Background
After Massena's victory in the Second Battle of Zurich, the alliance between Russia and Austria ended. Though this did not end the war, Napoleon soon came back from Egypt and proclaimed himself First Consul, greatly improving French chances of victory. However, the consul needed time to move his troops into Italy, so he ordered Masséna to hold Nice and Genoa at all costs until he arrived.

Beginning
Initially, the French had about 60,000 soldiers, but this number was reduced to about 36,000 fighting men due to a typhus epidemic that had also taken the lives of two of Masséna's predecessors, generals Jean-Étienne Championnet and Jean-Antoine Marbot. The Austrian commander, Michael von Melas, had around 120,000 soldiers available in Italy. After the first engagements, despite the bravery of French soldiers under Louis-Gabriel Suchet and Jean-de-Dieu Soult, Genoa was soon cut off from any outside help. By 6 April, the French were surrounded not only by land, but also by sea where a strong British squadron had just taken up positions. Nevertheless, French morale remained high and Masséna was determined to hold on.

Siege
Though Genoa was defended both by nature and by strong fortifications, Massénaa planned a more offensive strategy. On 7 April, he ordered an attack on Monte Ratti, which resulted in the Austrians being thrown out of the Apennines and the French capturing about 1,500 prisoners, including General-Major Konstantin Ghilian Karl d'Aspré. Two days later, Masséna began a desperate operation to unite with the rest of the French forces commanded by Suchet. Although Massena was cut off with only 1,200 soldiers against 10,000 Austrians, he endured their attacks and, with the help of Soult, captured another 4,000 prisoners. After this battle, the French finally shut themselves in the city. Other desperately fought battles soon followed, especially those for Fort Quezzi and Fort Richelieu, inflicting further heavy casualties on the Austrians. French forces then captured Mount Creto, forcing the Austrians to halt all further actions.

In the meantime, Bonaparte was marching with the Army of the Reserve not to the relief of Genoa, but to Milan, where he spent six days. By the end of May, plague had spread throughout Genoa and the civilian population was in revolt. Negotiations for the exchange of prisoners began in early June, but the citizens and some of the garrison clamoured for capitulation. Unknown to Masséna, the Austrian general Peter Ott had been ordered to raise the siege because Bonaparte had crossed Great St. Bernard Pass and was now threatening the main Austrian army. Describing the situation at Genoa, Ott requested and received permission to continue the siege. On 4 June, Masséna's negotiator finally agreed to evacuate the French army from Genoa. However, "if the word capitulation was mentioned or written", Masséna threatened to end all negotiations.

Two days later, a few of the French left the city by sea, but the bulk of Masséna's starving and exhausted troops marched out of the city with all their equipment and followed the road along the coast toward France, ending one of the most remarkable sieges in modern military history. The siege was an astonishing demonstration of tenacity, ingenuity, courage, and daring that garnered additional laurels for Masséna and placed him in a category previously reserved for Bonaparte alone.

Aftermath
The gruelling siege of some sixty days had ended but it played an important role in Napoleon's strategy. By forcing the Austrians to deploy vast forces against himself at Genoa, Masséna made it possible for Bonaparte to cross the Great St Bernard Pass, surprise the Austrians, and ultimately defeat General Melas's army at Marengo before sufficient reinforcements could be transferred from the siege site. Less than three weeks after the evacuation, Bonaparte wrote to Masséna, "I am not able to give you a greater mark of the confidence I have in you than by giving you command of the first army of the Republic [Army of Italy]." The Austrians also recognized the significance of Masséna's defense; the Austrian chief of staff declared firmly, "You won the battle, not in front of Alessandria but in front of Genoa."

Notes

Citations

Sieges of the French Revolutionary Wars
Battles of the War of the Second Coalition
Sieges involving Austria
Battles in Liguria
Sieges involving France
Events in Genoa
Conflicts in 1800
1800 in Italy
1800 in Austria
1800 in France
Ligurian Republic
Battles inscribed on the Arc de Triomphe